Rozina, the Love Child is a 1945 Czechoslovak drama film directed by Otakar Vávra. The film starred Marie Glázrová.

Cast
 Marie Glázrová as Rozina
 Zdeněk Štěpánek as Prior Antonín
 Ladislav Boháč as Craftsman Nikolo
 František Kreuzmann as Guildmaster Giovanni Karf
 Jan Pivec as Craftsman Potměbílý
 Gustav Hilmar as Blacksmith Jan Turek
 Saša Rašilov as Brother Bartolo
 Antonín Solc as Father Bonifác
 Lola Skrbková as Cook Afra
 Zdeňka Baldová as Marriage broker Straková
 Marie Vášová as Maid Manda Váňová

References

External links
 

1945 films
1940s Czech-language films
Films directed by Otakar Vávra
Czechoslovak black-and-white films
1945 drama films
Czechoslovak drama films
1940s Czech films